Erhard Minder (16 January 1925 – 15 January 2002) was a Swiss modern pentathlete. He competed at the 1952 and 1960 Summer Olympics.

References

External links
 

1925 births
2002 deaths
Swiss male modern pentathletes
Olympic modern pentathletes of Switzerland
Modern pentathletes at the 1952 Summer Olympics
Modern pentathletes at the 1960 Summer Olympics
People from Winterthur District
Sportspeople from the canton of Zürich